Eupithecia semilugens is a moth in the family Geometridae. It is found in Argentina.

References

Moths described in 1906
semilugens
Moths of South America